Guess with Jess is an interactive animated children's television series featuring Jess the Cat from the television series Postman Pat. The show follows Jess' adventures with his friends on Greendale Farm in London, England, and how they always try to solve each other's problems with a Big Question, which is answered by "asking, testing, find a way". Jess and his friends search for the answers to science and nature-based questions, allowing children to learn about the world around them. 52 episodes were produced.

Unlike his appearance in Postman Pat, Jess in this series has the ability to talk to his friends on the farm.

New episodes of the series originally aired on the DreamWorks Channel in Thailand until 2020.

Characters
 Jess – the protagonist and host of the series. He is a young, curious black and white cat with green eyes, from the CBeebies series Postman Pat. He was voiced by Charlie George.
 Willow – a skewbald horse wearing a sunhat. The largest of all the characters, she acts as a wise mother figure to Jess. Willow shares the stable with the puppies, Joey and Jinx. She was voiced by Miranda Montague.
 Mimi – a pink rabbit and Jess' best friend who lives in a hutch around the farmyard garden. Mimi has an affinity with arts and crafts and she enjoys making anything colourful or unique. She was voiced by Jo Wyatt.
 Baa – a sheep with a blue beanie and a blue and white scarf. He always hangs out with Billie, who both live up in buttercup meadow. Baa tends to be afraid of more things than the others and particularly hates getting wet because the water stays in his wool a long time, making him cold and miserable and also makes his wool heavy. He was voiced by Bailey Pepper.
 Billie – a fieldmouse. She is often seen with Baa and rides around on his hat, since Baa can get places faster than she can. She carries a magnifying glass and a set of binoculars so she can investigate the "big question" further. She was voiced by Maria Darling.
 Horace – a frog who wears large glasses and lives at the pond. he loves making music and instruments out of natural found objects. He was voiced by Daniel Anthony.
 Joey and Jinx – two twin puppy siblings. Joey (the boy) wears a blue collar with a bone shaped dog tag and Jinx (the girl) wears a pink collar with a flower shaped dog tag and a flower in her hair. They both love to run about the farm, rolling about in the mud and jumping over puddles. They were voiced by Kyle Stanger and Eleanor Webster.
 A host of minor characters - such as Sammy Snail, Brown Bird, Kevin the fish, etc.

Episodes
There were 2 seasons and 52 episodes.

References

Notes

Sources

External links
 

BBC children's television shows
Treehouse TV original programming
2000s British animated television series
2010s British animated television series
2000s British children's television series
2010s British children's television series
2000s Canadian animated television series
2010s Canadian animated television series
2000s Canadian children's television series
2010s Canadian children's television series
2009 British television series debuts
2009 Canadian television series debuts
2013 British television series endings
2013 Canadian television series endings
Television series by Nelvana
Television series by Universal Television
Animated television series about cats
Animated television series about children
Animated television series about dogs
Animated television series about horses
Animated television series about rabbits and hares
Animated television series about mice and rats
Animated television series about frogs
British computer-animated television series
Canadian computer-animated television series
British children's animated adventure television series
British children's animated fantasy television series
Canadian children's animated adventure television series
Canadian children's animated fantasy television series
British preschool education television series
Canadian preschool education television series
Animated preschool education television series
2000s preschool education television series
2010s preschool education television series
CBeebies
English-language television shows